A Searchers EP is a 2001 EP by Remy Zero released in the United States by Elektra Records designed to promote the band.

Track listing

Credits
Engineer – Bob Ebeling (track 3), David Slovis (track 2), Greg Duffin (track 2), Remy Zero (tracks 1+5) 
Mixed By – Bob Ebeling (track 3), Chris Gibbons, Remy Zero (tracks 1, 3+5) 
Photography – Jaimie Trueblood 
Producer – Remy Zero (tracks 1, 3+5) 
Recorded By – Chris Gibbons

References
Item Information

2001 EPs
Remy Zero albums
Elektra Records EPs